Walter Wilcox Burridge (1857 – June 25, 1913) was a painter in the United States. He did theater set work and established his own studio. Burridge did work on a cyclorama of Kilauea at the Volcano House. He also did many scene paintings for theatrical productions. In his obituary, the Brooklyn Eagle called him one of the foremost scene painters of his time.

Burridge painted the principal curtain at the McVickers Theater: Chicago in 1833. He was in Albuquerque, New Mexico to work on the Panama Exposition when he died of heart disease in 1913. He was buried at Forest Home Cemetery in Forest Park, Illinois.

Burridge was from Brooklyn and his father Henry was the proprietor of the Old Masons Arms Inn there.

Work
The Woman Haters (opened October 7, 1912) scenic design
The Man from Cook's (opened March 25, 1912) scenic design
The Three Romeos (opened November 13, 1911) scenic design
Everywoman (opened February 27, 1911) scenic design
The Merry Widow (opened October 21, 1907) scenic design
The Prince of Pilsen (opened March 19, 1906) scenic design
The County Chairman (opened September 1, 1904) scenic design
A Country Girl (opened September 22, 1902) scenic design
Arizona (opened September 10, 1900) scenic design

References

1857 births
1913 deaths
19th-century American painters
20th-century American painters
Artists from Brooklyn